The Tuckahoe Union Free School District is headquartered in the town of Eastchester, in Westchester County, New York, and  serves portions of Eastchester and Tuckahoe.

It operates three schools: William E. Cottle School (elementary), Tuckahoe Middle School, and Tuckahoe High School.

History

Carl Albano became the superintendent in 2016. He later, in January–March 2019, complained to the New York state comptrollers' office over a proposed land deal with the Eastchester government made by the school board. Albano planned to end his term in June 2020, but he decided instead to leave on Tuesday December 3, 2019. Anne Goodman became superintendent, and then was formally hired as superintendent in April 2020.

References

Further reading
 Intermunicipal Agreement between the Town of Eastchester and the Tuckahoe Union Free School District

External links
 Tuckahoe Union Free School District

School districts in New York (state)
Eastchester, New York
Education in Westchester County, New York
Tuckahoe, Westchester County, New York